The Central University of Ecuador is a national university located in Quito, Ecuador and is the oldest and largest university in Ecuador, and one of the oldest in the Americas.  The enrollment at Central University of Ecuador is over 10,000 students per year.

One of the cornerstones of Central University of Ecuador is the medical school, which is one of the best in the country.

The Library Network System at Central University of Ecuador 

The goal of the Library Network System is to facilitate the preservation, dissemination and free access to the resources of scientific, technological, documentary, tangible and virtual information, while supporting the development of teaching, learning and research in the processes of creation, transmission, knowledge management and liaison with the community.

Communications and culture 

The Joint National Music and Latinoamericana "The Chakana" is a musical group that has formed through the initiative and support of the Department of Communication and Culture of the Central University of Ecuador. The code that handles consists of songs and instrumental pieces with a focus harboring native rhythms and airs both Ecuador and Latin America rescuing own musical roots and common that make us a cultural continental bloc from the origins of our history as American peoples.

Director: Professor Javier Muñoz
CUDAE-Traditional Dance

The multicultural and multi-ethnic Ecuador is a point of realization through the musical representation, traditional dance. This kind of folk dance is closely related to the cultural roots of a community, whose practice is done more by inheritance of tradition from generation to generation, that innovation. The cultural richness of our country, concocted by the socio-historical processes is represented through the body: rituals that express the symbolic force of events or events that marked their future.

Director: Professor Nelson Diaz
University Choir

It was created on November 22, 1960 under the direction of Maestro Victor Austrian Bürger. He has represented the Central University of Ecuador inside and outside the country for 54 years. Among the directors I have told the Choir Master Gerardo Guevara.

History

Organization

Schools 

 School of Architecture and Urbanism
 School of Arts
 School of Administration
 School of Agriculture
 School of Chemical Engineering
 School of Economics
 School of Engineering, Physics and Mathematics
 School of Geology, Mining, and Environment
 School of Law, Political and Social Sciences
 School of Medicine
 School of Odontology
 School of Psychology
 School of Pharmacy
 School of Philosophy and Pedagogy
 School of Social Communication
 School of Veterinary Medicine

Architecture

Arts 
The Art school program at Central University of Ecuador has numerous classes in ceramics, printmaking, visual arts and fine arts especially drawing, illustration, painting, photography, sculpture, and graphic design. The Art school  was founded in 1967 and offers secondary, post-secondary or undergraduate, graduate or postgraduate programs in these areas. It has an undergraduate program in painting, printmaking, sculpture and ceramics. Also offers programs in the performing arts, specially theatre and acting. Currently is working in implementing music and dance programs for undergraduate and graduate studies. They are distinguished from larger institutions which also may offer majors or degrees in the visual arts, but only as one part of a broad-based range of programs (such as the liberal arts and sciences). France's École des Beaux-Arts is, perhaps, the first model for such organized instruction, breaking with a tradition of master and apprentice instruction when it was formed. The art school of the Central University of Ecuador follows a long tradition in academic learning of the art practice since it takes the place of the Fine arts school of Quito founded in 1904 and the school of arts founded in 1969.

Engineering: Geology, Mining, and Environment

School of Medicine 
The medical school at Central University of Ecuador is one of the oldest in Ecuador that teaches medicine, and awards a professional degree for physicians and surgeons. Such medical degrees.
. The medical school at Central University of Ecuador is one of the oldest in Ecuador. Ecuador's first female university professor, Juana Miranda, worked at the School of Medicine.

Infrastructure
Universidad Central metro station is close to the university campus and provides access to the university.

Notable alumni 
 Diana Salazar Méndez, Attorney General of Ecuador, 1 April 2019 to present

See also 

 List of colonial universities in Latin America
 List of Jesuit sites
 List of universities in Ecuador

References 

 
Educational institutions established in 1826
National universities
Universities in Ecuador
1826 establishments in Gran Colombia